Anwarul is a given name. Notable people with the name include:

Kazi Anwarul Haque (1909–2001), Bangladeshi police officer, bureaucrat, and technocrat minister
Sheikh Anwarul Haq (1917–1995), Pakistani jurist and an academic, Chief Justice of Pakistan 1977–1981
M Anwarul Azim (1931–1971), Bengali industrial administrator, killed in the Bangladesh Liberation war
Anwarul Karim Chowdhury (born 1943), Bangladeshi diplomat noted for work on development in the poorest nations, global peace and the rights of women and children
Shamsul Anwarul Huq (born 1944), Rohingya academic, pro-democracy activist and former politician in Myanmar
Anwarul Iqbal (1950–2015), adviser of 2007–2009 interim Caretaker Government of Bangladesh
Anwarul Haque (1956–2017), Bangladesh Supreme Court justice, Chairman of International Crimes Tribunal-1
Anwarul Momen, two star rank Bangladesh Army officer and GOC of 17th Infantry Division
Anwarul Kabir Talukdar, former politician of Bangladesh Nationalist Party politician and Liberal Democratic Party
Anwarul Amin Azhar, former Bangladeshi cricketer
Anwarul Azim (politician), Bangladesh Nationalist Party politician, former Member of Parliament

See also
Anwarul Islam Women's Arabic College Mongam, University of Calicut, Kerala
Anwar (disambiguation)